The Yelovaya, also known as Bolshaya Yelovaya and Chizhandzi is a river in Krasnoyarsk Krai in Russia, a left tributary of the Ket (Ob basin).

References

Rivers of Krasnoyarsk Krai